Ron Gingell (born 22 October 1920 - October 1988) was an English professional footballer, football scout and manager. He assumed the name "Ron" as he disliked his birth names "Claude Samuel".

Gingell, who was born in Warmley, near Keynsham, played as a full back for Exeter City before World War II, and for Chelsea, Liverpool and Bury as a wartime guest. After the war, he signed for Cheltenham Town. He later became chief scout for Bristol Rovers, and became their caretaker manager for one game in 1981 at the age of 61, following the departure of Terry Cooper from the club.

References

1920 births
1988 deaths
People from South Gloucestershire District
Sportspeople from Gloucestershire
English footballers
English football managers
Exeter City F.C. players
Chelsea F.C. wartime guest players
Liverpool F.C. wartime guest players
Bury F.C. wartime guest players
Bristol Rovers F.C. managers
Association football fullbacks